Chris or Christopher Drake may refer to:
Chris Drake (1923–2006), American actor
Christopher Drake, American film and television composer
Chris Drake (tennis), former American professional tennis player
Chris Drake (The Only Way Is Essex), reality television personality